Rudolph F. DiBlasi (February 24, 1919 – November 2, 1977) was an American politician who served in the New York State Assembly from the 36th district from 1967 to 1969 and in the New York City Council from the 19th district from 1970 to 1973.

He died on November 2, 1977, in Manhattan, New York City, New York at age 58.

References

1919 births
1977 deaths
Democratic Party members of the New York State Assembly
New York City Council members
20th-century American politicians